János Komjáti (27 December 1952 – 1978) was a Hungarian weightlifter. He competed in the men's middleweight event at the 1976 Summer Olympics.

References

1952 births
1978 deaths
Hungarian male weightlifters
Olympic weightlifters of Hungary
Weightlifters at the 1976 Summer Olympics
Place of birth missing